Elliott Masie is an educational technology expert credited with coining the phrase 'E-Learning' to describe online learning.[1][2] He is among the most well known figures in the eLearning industry and awarded the position of number 1 on eLearning Industry's movers and shakers list in 2017.[3] He is primarily known for his work in corporate learning and organizational performance.[4] He is editor of 'Learning TRENDS by Elliott Masie'[5] an online eLearning newsletter. He is also founder of the MASIE Center as well as chair of The Learning Consortium. He is the convener of 'Learning' an annual eLearning conference. He is the CEO of MASIE Productions and a member of the Washington Speakers Bureau.

Published works 
Elliott Masie has written eleven books:
 Learning Rants, Raves, and Reflections: A Collection of Passionate and Professional Perspectives
 Computer Training Handbook
 The computer training handbook How to teach people
 Computers + Student Activities Handbook
 Using Computers in College Student Activities
 Computer Trainer's Personal Training Guide (Training Guides)
 The computer training handbook: how to teach people to use computers
 The Computer Training Handbook: Strategies for Helping People to Learn Technology
 Master Trainer Handbook: Tips, Tactics, and How-Tos for Delivering Effective Instructor-Led, Participant-Centered Training
 Big Learning Data
 The Masie Center's Learning Perspectives

MASIE Productions 
Elliott Masie is the CEO and lead investor in MASIE Productions. MASIE Productions started out as a conference and events company in the 1990s. Its most well known conference is 'Learning' an annual conference focusing on utilising technology within corporate training. MASIE Productions has also been involved in the production of Broadway theatre. They have been involved with a variety of productions, including:
The Prom
The Cher Show
American Son
SpongeBob SquarePants
 Kinky Boots
 Allegiance
 MacBeth
 The Trip to Bountiful
 Somewhere in Time
 Chinglish
 Godspell

References

External links
Official website of The MASIE Center
Official website of Masie Productions
Twitter

American theatre managers and producers
Living people
Year of birth missing (living people)